Samuel Adegboyega University (SAU) is located in Ogwa, Edo State, Nigeria, West Africa. It was founded by The Apostolic Church Nigeria, LAWNA (Lagos, Western and Northern Areas) Territory, which has her headquarters at Olorunda-Ketu, Lagos.

The university, named after the first Nigerian Superintendent of the church, Pastor Samuel Gbadebo Adegboyega. The institution received its licence from the Federal Government Of Nigeria on Monday March 7, 2011 as the 45th Private University and 117th overall in the Nigerian University system. The university took off its first academic session in 2011/2012.

The inaugural class, consisting of 58 students, graduated in September 2015. On 30 May 2018,the Vice-Chancellor of Samuel Adegboyega University, Professor Bernard Aigbokhan reiterated that all 14 academic programmes presented to the National Universities Commission in 2016 were given  full accreditation.  Also, on August 31, 2018, The National Universities Commission approved 13 postgraduate programmes for Samuel Adegboyega University with effect from 2018/2019 Academic Session.

Colleges 
The university has four main colleges:
College of Basic and Applied Sciences
College of Humanities
College of Social and Management Sciences
College of Law

References

External links

Samuel Adegboyega University
2011 establishments in Nigeria
Educational institutions established in 2011
Christian universities and colleges in Nigeria
Education in Edo State